Hederagenin is a triterpenoid which is a chemical constituent of the Hedera helix plant.

Hederagenin is the aglycone part of numerous saponins found in Hedera helix (common ivy), the most prevalent of these being hederacoside C and alpha-hederin.  It is also one of three primary triterpenoids extracted from the Chenopodium quinoa plant categorized by the EPA as a biopesticide.  HeadsUp Plant Protectant is made up of approximately equal ratios of the saponin aglycones oleanolic acid, hederagenin, and phytolaccagenic acid and is intended for use as a seed treatment on tuber (e.g. potato seed pieces), legume, and cereal seeds or as a pre-plant root dip for roots of transplants, at planting, to prevent fungal growth, bacterial growth, and viral plant diseases.

Hederagenin has been found to have antidepressant-like effects in a rodent models.

History
Hederagenin was discovered by L. Posselt in 1849 and named hederic acid.  However, Posselt was not able to isolate a pure substance or obtain an exact formula: his hederic acid was hederagenin mixed with some tannin impurity.

Related triterpenes
All of these compounds share the same pentacyclic framework:

 Betulinic acid
 Boswellic acid
 Glycyrrhetinic acid
 Moronic acid
 Oleanolic acid
 Ursolic acid
 Corosolic acid
 Amyrin
 Lupeol
 Maslinic acid
 Hopane

References

Biopesticides
Carboxylic acids
Triterpenes
Diols